Anri Egutidze (born 1 March 1996) is a Georgian-born Portuguese judoka. In June 2021, he won one of the bronze medals in the men's 81 kg at the 2021 World Judo Championships held in Budapest, Hungary.

He is one of the bronze medallist of the 2019 Judo Grand Slam Brasilia in the −81 kg class. He competed at the 2020 Summer Olympics in Tokyo where he was eliminated in the second round by the eventual bronze medalist, Shamil Borchashvili of Austria.

References

External links
 

1996 births
Living people
People from Georgia (country)
Portuguese male judoka
Judoka at the 2014 Summer Youth Olympics
Judoka at the 2019 European Games
European Games medalists in judo
European Games silver medalists for Portugal
Judoka at the 2020 Summer Olympics
S.L. Benfica (martial arts)
Olympic judoka of Portugal
Portuguese people of European descent